The next Irish general election to Dáil Éireann, the lower house of Ireland's parliament, the Oireachtas, will be held by March 2025, to elect between 171 and 181 TDs across Dáil constituencies of between 3 and 5 seats.

The 33rd Dáil must be dissolved by the president at the request of the Taoiseach no later than 19 February 2025. The current Taoiseach is Leo Varadkar, leader of Fine Gael, who is leading a coalition government of Fianna Fáil, Fine Gael, and the Green Party. He took office as Taoiseach in December 2022, following a rotation agreement with Micheál Martin, leader of Fianna Fáil, who had served as Taoiseach from June 2020.

After the 2020 general election, the Dáil met on 20 February, but no candidate was nominated by the Dáil to form a government. Varadkar resigned as Taoiseach, but continued to carry out duties pending the appointment of his successor. Negotiations concluded on 27 June 2020 with an agreement for a three-party coalition, with both Martin and Varadkar serving as Taoiseach during the 33rd Dáil.

Constituency review
The size of the Dáil will increase from 160 TDs at the next election. This will be the first review of constituencies carried out by the Electoral Commission established under the Electoral Reform Act 2022, where previously they had been carried out by a Constituency Commission. The Commission is required to recommend a size of the Dáil of between 171 and 181 TDs. This range reflects the growth in the population of the state, and the requirement of Article 16.6.2° of the Constitution of Ireland that there be one TD elected for no less than every 20,000 of the population and no more than every 30,000.

The preliminary results of the 2022 census showed a population of over 5.1 million, which would require a minimum Dáil size of 171 TDs. This would be the largest number in the history of the State, surpassing the previous number of 166 TDs from 1981 to 2016. The number of constituencies may also change, depending on the recommendations of the constituency review, which is due to be published in July 2023. Each constituency will return between three and five TDs, elected on the system of single transferable vote, in which voters rank candidates on their ballot papers.

Electoral system

When the ballot papers are counted, a quota is determined by dividing the number of valid votes by the number of seats, plus one. Any candidate receiving a number of votes exceeding the quota is elected. If fewer candidates reach the quota than the number of seats to be filled, the last-placed candidate is removed from the count and the second or subsequent preferences on those ballot papers are redistributed until a candidate is elected. If such a candidate now has more votes than the quota, their surplus is given to other candidates in order of ranking on the ballot papers. This is repeated until sufficient candidates have passed the quota to fill the available seats, or where a seat remains to be filled in a constituency and no candidate is capable of achieving a quota as there is nobody left to eliminate for a distribution then the highest place candidate without a  quota is deemed elected at that point.

The outgoing Ceann Comhairle (currently Seán Ó Fearghaíl) will be returned automatically unless he announces to the Dáil that he wishes to retire as a TD.

Date of election
The current Dáil must be dissolved no later than Wednesday 19 February 2025. This date is calculated from the provisions of Electoral Act 1992, Section 33, which states that the same Dáil shall not continue for a longer period than five years from the date of its first meeting. The writ for the election must be moved on the dissolution of the Dáil. The election must take place on a day 18 to 25 days (disregarding any excluded day) after the writs have been moved.

Retiring incumbents
The following members of the 33rd Dáil are not seeking re-election:

Opinion polls
In the run-up to the election, various organisations are conducting opinion polls to gauge voting intentions. Results of such polls are displayed in this list.

The date range for these opinion polls is from the previous Irish general election, held on 8 February 2020, to the next election, which can be held no later than 20 February 2025.

Notes

References

General elections in the Republic of Ireland
Future elections in Europe
2020s in Irish politics
Irish general election
2020s elections in the Republic of Ireland